Victor Morin (August 15, 1865 – September 30, 1960) was a Canadian notary, politician, and writer.

Born in Saint-Hyacinthe, Canada East, Morin studied at the Université Laval de Montréal. In 1890, he started working as a notary in his uncle's firm Papineau & Marin. He would practice his profession for the next 72 years.

In 1910, he was elected to the Montreal City Council for the Centre (Vieux-Montréal) district.

From 1915 to 1924, he was president of the Saint-Jean-Baptiste Society. A Fellow of the Royal Society of Canada, he served as its president from 1938 to 1939.

He is the author of the Code Morin, a book of rules for conducting deliberative assemblies, used in Quebec and Acadia. Morin's rules are inspired by Robert's Rules of Order.

References

1865 births
1960 deaths
Fellows of the Royal Society of Canada
People from Saint-Hyacinthe
Presidents of the Saint-Jean-Baptiste Society of Montreal
Burials at Notre Dame des Neiges Cemetery